Miranda Jane Seymour (born 8 August 1948) is an English literary critic, novelist and biographer. The lives she has described have included those of Robert Graves and Mary Shelley. Seymour, a Fellow of the Royal Society of Literature, has in recent years been a visiting Professor of English Studies at Nottingham Trent University and a Fellow of the Royal Society of Arts.

Early life and education
Miranda Seymour was two years old when her parents moved into Thrumpton Hall, the family ancestral home, a Jacobean mansion in the quiet village of Thrumpton, Nottinghamshire, on the south bank of the River Trent.

She studied at Bedford College, London, now part of Royal Holloway, University of London, earning a BA in English in 1981.

Career
Seymour's works include biographies of Lady Ottoline Morrell, Mary Shelley and Robert Graves, about whom she also wrote a novel, The Telling and a radio play, Sea Music. She wrote a group portrait of Henry James in his later years, entitled A Ring of Conspirators. In 2001, she came across material on Hellé Nice, a forgotten French Grand Prix racing driver of the 1930s. After extensive research, Seymour published an acclaimed book in 2004 about Nice's ultimately tragic life. In 2008 she published In My Father's House: Elegy for an Obsessive Love (Simon & Schuster, UK), which appeared in the US as Thrumpton Hall (HarperCollins) and won the 2008 Pen Ackerley Prize for Memoir of the Year. Another unusual life she traced was of a 1930s film star, Virginia Cherrill, based on a substantial archive in private ownership. Noble Endeavours: Stories from England; Stories from Germany appeared in September 2013 from Simon & Schuster. Seymour's In Byron's Wake (2018) covers the lives of Lord Byron's wife and daughter, Annabella Milbanke and Ada Lovelace.

Personal life

In 1972, Seymour married the novelist and historian Andrew Sinclair and had a son, Merlin. Her second marriage, to Anthony Gottlieb, then executive editor of The Economist and author of a history of Western philosophy, ended in 2003. A transatlantic literary room-swap led to a third marriage in 2006 to Ted Lynch, a Bostonian. Seymour now divides her time between London and Thrumpton Hall, a Nottinghamshire residence which has been in private ownership for 500 years

Bibliography

Fiction

References

External links
Official homepage
Transcript of interview with Ramona Koval, The Book Show, ABC Radio National 1 April 2007
House Proud Book review of Thrumpton Hall: A Memoir of Life in My Father's House by Charles McGrath New York Times 27 July 2008
'The Knife by the Handle at Last' Tim Parks review of Thrumpton Hall: A Memoir of Life in My Father's House from The New York Review of Books - Subscription based

1948 births
Living people
Academics of Nottingham Trent University
Alumni of Bedford College, London
English biographers
English journalists
Fellows of the Royal Society of Literature